The Baltimore Orioles, formerly the St. Louis Browns, are an American professional baseball franchise currently based in Baltimore, Maryland. They were founded in 1894 as the Milwaukee Brewers of the Western League and joined the American League (AL) in 1901, before relocating to St.  Louis the following season –  a move planned by the league several years before its fruition.

The Browns generally struggled in their early years as a Major League team, never finishing higher than fourth before 1921, and in fact having only eight winning seasons before World War II. They lost over 100 games five times, and in 1939 set an unenviable MLB record for the highest earned run average against a team on record at just over 6.00 per nine innings. They did not play in a World Series until 1944 – when most other teams were decimated by the war – and had no winning seasons between 1946 and their sixth season in Baltimore as the "Orioles" in 1959. Starting in 1960, the Orioles became contenders, finishing in second place in 1960 and third place in 1961, 1964 and 1965.

After this, however, the Orioles entered their golden age between 1966 and 1983, when they won three World Series, played in the postseason eight times, and had eighteen consecutive winning seasons between 1968 and 1985. The period from 1986 to 2011, however, was another era of failure apart from a short period in the middle 1990s. The Orioles played in the postseason only twice over twenty-eight seasons and suffered fourteen successive losing seasons between 1998 and 2011, before in 2012 surprisingly winning 93 games and their first playoff series since 1997.

Year by year

Record by decade 
The following table describes the Brewers' (1901), Browns' (1902-1953), and Orioles' (1954-2022) MLB win–loss record by decade.

These statistics are from Baseball-Reference.com's Baltimore Orioles History & Encyclopedia, and are current as of the end of the 2022 MLB regular season.

Postseason record by year
The Orioles have made the postseason fifteen times in their history, with their first being in 1944 and the most recent being in 2016.

References

External links 
 Orioles Year-By-Year Results at MLB.com
 Orioles Postseason Results at MLB.com
 Baltimore Orioles Statistics at Baseball-Reference.com
 Baltimore Orioles Stadiums et attendances at Baseball-Reference.com

 
Baltimore Orioles
Seasons